Premeno is a comune (municipality) in the Province of Verbano-Cusio-Ossola in the Italian region Piedmont, located about  northeast of Turin and about  northeast of Verbania.

The municipality of Premeno contains the frazioni (subdivisions, mainly villages and hamlets) Esio and Pollino.

Premeno borders the following municipalities: Aurano, Bee, Ghiffa, Intragna, Oggebbio, Vignone.

Demographic evolution

References

Cities and towns in Piedmont